The Blackest Eye is an EP by the American punk rock band Aye Nako.

Track listing 
All songs by Aye Nako.

Personnel 
 Mars Ganito – Vocals, Guitar
 Joe McCann - Bass guitar
 Jade Payne - Guitar
 Angie Boylan - Drums

References 

Don Giovanni Records albums
2015 EPs